Peter de Zwaan (Meppel, 17 August 1944) is a Dutch writer of thrillers for young readers; he is best known as the second writer of the Bob Evers series, which he took over after the death of Willem van den Hout.

References

1944 births
Living people
Dutch children's writers
Dutch thriller writers
People from Meppel